Gorchitza is a Ukrainian electronic music band from Kyiv which sings in English.
According to music press, the band is one of the representatives of contemporary pop&electronic music.

They supported in Kyiv some major international acts such as 
Nelly Furtado, Faithless, Morcheeba, J.J.Johanson, Kosheen and others.

History

Early stages 
Gorchitza emerged through the efforts of composer, producer and musician Alexey Gorchitza (Alexey Laptev). For 6 years Alexey worked as a sound engineer at the local Kerch radio station, until he founded  his own "Kublo-production", based at the studio of Sofia Rotaru. There he remixed tracks of Alyona Vinnickaya, the bands Number 482,  Mumiy Troll and many other famous Ukrainian and Russian acts. Then he began experimenting with computer music, but soon decided to create a live electronic project.

The first formation was compiled of two local bands, called Vedo (ukr. Вєдо) and Radiokefir (rus. Радиокефир), in  2002. The band was singing in Ukrainian and won a renowned Ukrainian band contest Krasche Razom (ukr. Краще Разом), but soon the band broke up for any reason and the only thing remained was its name "Gorchitza".

Debut
The turning point in the history of the band marked the introduction of Alexey with a House vocalist Alloise (Alla Moskovka), well known in Kyiv club scene.

They got to know each other almost by accident, when Alexey invited Alloise to the studio, as he needed a strong female vocal part for a record. After only a few months of fruitful co-operation the new band Gorchitza had created enough material to play their debut-concert in the Kyiv club "Kaif", on October 6, 2006. This day the band consider to be their official Birthdate.

Their first single Kiss Me Loneliness became a national radio hit (# 13 annual national radio charts Ukraine).

Their first major live appearance was a warm-up for Faithless in front of 10,000 audience on the stage of the Kyiv Palace of Sports, in  June 2007. Joint stage performances with international stars such as Nelly Furtado, Placebo, Chemical Brothers, Stereo MC's, J.J.Johanson and Red Snapper followed soon. Since then the band is being booked continuously for festivals, corporate events of well-known international brands, private parties and club shows.

International success
In October 2007, the band released the single One New Message, followed by a video clip. The track became the band's most recognizable song and brought Gorchitza international recognition and massive popularity. In January 2008, the famous British band Apollo 440 remixed the track One New Message, for which Gorchitza became widely known abroad - mainly due to house-made online promo.

In April 2008, Gorchitza got signed by Lavina Music, and released their first studio album Highlights. Half a year later, in October they became finalists of the biggest Polish festival SOPOT and got signed by EMI Music Poland.

In December 2008, Gorchitza became the first band in East Europe to release an album on microSD memory card, 10,000 copies sold. Nokia produced a series of mobile phones pre-installed with Gorchitza's music.

Gorchitza's success in Russia began with a showcase at the popular Lounge Fest in Moscow, where the band performed together with Skye Edwards (Morcheeba) in August 2009.

Having gathered a lot of positive reviews in the press, Gorchitza returned with their first Russian solo concert in Moscow Rock-club 16 Tons, on March 17, 2010. According to media reports, the club couldn't accommodate everyone — about 700 guests came in, two times exceeding the capacity of the club.

After a successful market entry in Russia IKON introduced the band for the first time to the German audience at Popkomm on September 9, 2010 in Berlin. The crowd mainly consisted of professionals and industry players including mass media representatives, A&Rs and CEOs of several labels and industry associations. The band's second gig in Germany took place in Hamburg on September 23, 2010, on the opening day of the famous Reeperbahn Festival and attracted a mixed audience of professionals and fans, locals and expats. The band's first European tour outside its home markets Russia and Ukraine is scheduled for the winter 2010/2011 approximately starting in Germany and powered by IKON.

Trivia
Gorchitza are Nightlife Award winners as "Best Vocal Club Project 2007".

Nokia released a special edition of its mobile phones pre-installed with Gorchitza's music, 15,000 pieces sold within the first month after release. They were the first band in Ukraine to release an album on SD memory card, over 100,000 copies sold.

Since August 2010 over 10,000,000 iPhone and iPod users worldwide enjoy the band's second studio album "It's You" as a special "Appbum" edition.

Band members

Alexey Gorchitza (Alexey Laptev) — front-man, key-boards, programming
Alloise  — Lead vocals, lyrics (2007-2012, 2017)
Alexey Kyrychenko — guitar
Artem Ugodnikov — drums
 
Former members:
Olya Dibrova - vocal, lyrics (2012-2017)
Oleg Kuzmenko — drums
Yaroslav Polishchuk — bass-guitar
Alexey Molchanov - drums

Discography

Albums
Highlights (2008) —  first studio album
Neytrino (2008) — Gorchitza's (Alexey) solo album
Highlights RMXS (2008) — remix album
It's You (2011)  —  second studio album

Singles
One New Message (2007) — single from the first studio album Highlights
Call It A Dream (2009) — single from the first studio album Highlights
Last Time (2010)  —  single from the second studio album It's You
Final Cut (2010)  —  single from the second studio album It's You, release scheduled for late 2010

Videos
One New Message
Kiss Me Loneliness
Call It A Dream
Final Cut
Last Time
One New Message (Apollo 440 remix)

Awards
Nightlife Award as "Best Vocal Club Project 2007"

References

External links
Gorchitza at Popkomm Announcement
Gorchitza at iMusic1 TV, Germany
Gorchitza playing "Mafia" on Muz TV
Gorchitza "It's You" Appbum on iTunes
Gorchitza at Muz TV brand new video clip presentation "Last Time"
Muz TV, PRO News, Gorchitza, First live concert in Moscow, 2010
Muz TV, PRO News, Gorchitza, Video clip premiere «Final Cut», 2010
Gorchitza and Morcheeba live at Stereoleto, St. Petersburg
MTV, NEWS Block, Gorchitza, First live concert in Moscow, 2010
MTV, NEWS Block, Gorchitza, Lounge Fest, 2009
MTV, NEWS Block, Gorchitza, First time in Russia, 2009
MIR TV, Historical hit, Gorchitza, 2010
TV Center, Morning Mood, Gorchitza, 2009
A-One, Gorchitza, Lounge Fest, 2009
О2TV, Morning Show, Gorchitza
Megapolis FM, Test, Gorchitza
Radio Mayak, Gorchitza
Radio Mayak, Gorchitza, Live Show
Radio Maximum, Gorchitza
Radio Maximum, Gorchitza, Web Profile
Silver Rain Radio, Gorchitza
Europa Plus, Gorchitza
PromoDJ, Gorchitza, First live concert in Moscow, 2010
Russia.ru, LIFE, Gorchitza, First live concert in Moscow, 2010 
Russia.ru, Gorchitza, Lounge Fest, 2009
Muz.ru, Lounge Fest, Morceeba, Gorchitza, 2009
Lounge Fest, Gorchitza
Playboy, Gorchitza, 2010
NuNote, Lounge Fest, Gorchitza, 2009

Ukrainian musical groups
English-language singers from Ukraine